Gameplay refers to the way a player interacts with a game.

Gameplay may also refer to:

 GamePlay (magazine), a Croatian video game magazine published from 2002 to 2011
 Gameplay (magazine), a Ukrainian video game magazine published from 2005 to 2010
 Emergent gameplay